Honeyst was a South Korean pop rock band formed by FNC Entertainment in 2017. The band consists of Oh Seung-seok (drummer), Kim Chul-min (main vocalist, guitarist, keyboardist), Seo Dong-sung (leader, vocalist, bassist), and Kim Hwan (guitarist, vocalist). Their debut single album Like You was released on May 17, 2017. On April 26, 2019, they disbanded after only two years of activity.

History

Pre-debut and NEOZ School
In May 2016, the four members participated as "NEOZ Band" on the Mnet reality survival show d.o.b. (dance or band), competing against other trainees in "NEOZ Dance" for the chance to debut. In the final episode on June 29, 2016, "NEOZ Band" eventually lost to "NEOZ Dance" who won the public voting and debuted as SF9.

In May 2017, FNC Entertainment announced that the four members would debut as Honeyst (a combination of the words "Honey" and "Artist") and would pursue an acoustic vibe.

2017–2019: Debut with Like You, Someone to Love and disbandment
Honeyst made their official debut with single album Like You on May 17, 2017. The single consists of three track with the lead single  "Like You". The single debuted at twenty-two on the Gaon Album Chart. On November 22, Honeyst released their second single album Someone to Love.

On April 26, 2019, FNC announced that HONEYST would be disbanding due to creative differences.

Members
 Oh Seung-seok (오승석) – drummer.
 Kim Chul-min (김철민) – main vocalist, guitarist, keyboardist.
 Seo Dong-sung (서동성) – leader, vocalist, bassist.
 Kim Hwan (김환) – guitarist, vocalist.

Discography

Single albums

Singles

References

External links
 
 

FNC Entertainment artists
South Korean pop rock music groups
Musical quartets
Musical groups established in 2017
South Korean boy bands
2017 establishments in South Korea